The men's team competition at the 2010 World Team Judo Championships was held on 31 October in Antalya, Turkey.

Results

Repechage

References

External links
 

Mteam
World 2010
World Men's Team Judo Championships